Texas flooding may refer to:

October 1998 Texas Flooding
June 2007 Texas flooding
2015 Texas–Oklahoma flood and tornado outbreak
Major floods caused by Hurricane Harvey in 2017